Upton Court Grammar School is a fully selective academy school in Lascelles Road, Slough, Berkshire.

The school has specialisms in languages and science. It is also a Leading Edge School, an ICT-Focus School, a Training School, an International School under the International Baccalaureate Organization (IBO) and a participant in the Primary Language Initiative. From September 2004 it offered some International Baccalaureate courses alongside its conventional secondary and sixth form courses, but these are now discontinued.

Slough Secondary School (1912–36)
Slough Secondary School was the name of the first major selective secondary school in Slough (originally Buckinghamshire but now Berkshire). It was founded in 1912 just to the west of William Street, in the town centre. By 1936, the School had outgrown its premises and was split into Slough Grammar School for boys (1936–82) in Lascelles Road and Slough High School for girls (1936–82) in Twinches Lane, although the girls stayed on in the William Street buildings until 1939 when their new buildings were ready.

The original Slough Secondary School buildings in William Street were re-used during the Second World War and afterwards as temporary school accommodation. They were redeveloped in the 1960s as the tower blocks of Slough College, which became the Slough Campus of Thames Valley University. The area is being redeveloped again, under the Heart of Slough project.

Headmasters
 Mr W. Francis Smith, BA (1912–25)
 Mr Ben Llewellyn (Acting) (1923–25)
 Mr Edward Rudland Clarke, MC, MA (Cantab), FRGS (1925–36) and continued with Slough Grammar School for Boys until 1952

Slough Grammar School for Boys (1936–82)
Slough Grammar School for Boys was a boys selective grammar school in Slough, It was created when the predecessor school, Slough Secondary School, split into separate Boys and Girls schools in 1936. It moved into purpose-built premises at Lascelles Road, which are still used by the current school.

Headmasters
 Mr Edward Rudland Clarke, MC, MA (Cantab), FRGS (1936–52) having started with Slough Secondary School in 1925
 Mr Tom Anderson (Acting) (1952)
 Dr Wilfrid Robert Victor Long, BA, PhD (1952–66)
 Mr Gerald H Painter, MSc, FInstP (1966–82) and continued with Upton Grammar School until 1988

Slough High School for Girls (1936–82)
Slough High School was a girls selective grammar school in Slough, Buckinghamshire, now Berkshire. It was formed in 1936 from the split of Slough Secondary School (1912–36) into Slough Grammar School for boys (1936–82) and Slough High School for girls.

For the first three years of its existence, it occupied the former Slough Secondary School buildings in William Street, but, in 1939, it moved to new buildings in Twinches Lane, Cippenham.

In 1982, when the Twinches Lane site was sold for redevelopment, Slough Grammar School and Slough High School merged to form Upton Grammar School (1982–93), based on the Lascelles Road site of Slough Grammar School.

Headmistresses
 Miss J M Crawford, MA (1936–62)
 Miss Gwyneth R J Owen (1962–78)
 Miss Pamela A Reakes, BA (1978–82)

Upton Grammar School (1982–93)
Upton Grammar School in Lascelles Road, Slough, was formed in 1982 by the re-merger of Slough Grammar School for boys (1936–82) and Slough High School for girls (1936–82), when the High School's Twinches Lane site was sold for redevelopment. The combined school was renamed Upton Grammar School to underline the merger of two equals. Slough Grammar and Slough High had both been formed in 1936 from the split of Slough Secondary School (1912–36).

Head teachers
 Mr Gerald H Painter, MSc, FInstP (1982–88) having started as Headmaster of Slough Grammar School for Boys in 1966
 Mrs Margaret A Lenton, BA, FRSA (1988–93) and continued with Slough Grammar School until 2010

Slough Grammar School (1993–2013)
In 1993, Upton Grammar School was renamed back to Slough Grammar School, while retaining its co-educational status, the previous school of this name having been single-sex status. The school converted into an academy in 2011.

Principals
 Mrs Margaret A Lenton, BA, FRSA (1993–2010) having started with Upton Grammar School in 1988
 Mrs Mercedes Hernández Estrada, MA (2010–13) and continued with Upton Court Grammar School until 2017

Upton Court Grammar School (2013–present)
In 2013, the Principal at that time, Mrs Mercedes Hernández Estrada, and the governors converted the school's name to Upton Court Grammar School. The chained swan logo was replaced by a phoenix rising. The School is also assisting two local schools – Foxborough Primary School and Trevelyan Middle School

Principals
 Mrs Mercedes Hernández Estrada, MA (2013–2017) having started with Slough Grammar School in 2010
 Mr Mark Pritchard MA (2017–present)

Reputation 
In April 2014 a team of registered inspectors conducted a two-day full review of Upton Court Grammar School following the Ofsted framework for inspection of schools. The school was given an overall rating of "Outstanding", although the Sixth Form was only rated "Good", with serious concerns raised over the number of students unable to progress from AS level to A2 level studies due to poor grades.
Upton Court Grammar is known as a multicultural school that has achieved a remarkably happy coexistence of students from diverse ethnic backgrounds. The school is committed to its international school status, and to the understanding of other cultures as well as other languages. The 2008 OFSTED inspection report describes Slough Grammar as "outstanding" the 2011 OFSTED interim assessment confirms that the standards are unchanged, The IB courses offered put it into a different category for 6th form league tables. The IB results were strong in 2006 and this has had a slight knock on effect in reducing the overall grade spread at A level.

, the IB courses have been discontinued.

Old Paludians 

The term "Paludian" for former students of the school(s) is derived from the Latin word palus (genitive paludis), meaning a marsh or slough. The term was first coined by the Headmaster, W. Francis Smith, in 1915, when the Old Paludians Association was formed, and has been in continuous use ever since. "Old Paludians" is sometimes informally contracted to "Old Pals".

In 1936, the Association split into the Boys (or Sports) section and the Girls section. By the 1950s, the Boys section reformed to become the Old Paludians Ltd. They moved to Taplow and nowadays play as Taplow United.

Meanwhile, the Girls section became the current Old Paludians Association and organises annual reunions for former students - both boys and girls.

Former students
Steve Bell – cartoonist
Dr Jeremy Black (1951–2004) – assyriologist
William Bradshaw, Baron Bradshaw
Cdre Laurie Brokenshire, CBE, RN (1952-2017) - puzzle specialist, magician
Susan Cooper - children's author
Lt Cdr. Richard John (Dickie) Cork, DSO, DFC (1917-1944) - WWII Fighter ace
Dennis Edwards (1937-2019) - footballer
Prof John Fothergill – Pro-Vice Chancellor, City University London
Philip Hinchcliffe – TV producer
Jeanne Hoban (1924–1997) – trade unionist and politician
Philip Hubble – butterfly swimmer
John King – author
Keith Mansfield – composer and arranger
Prof Robert Marler (1928–2014) – emeritus professor of neurobiology, physiology and ethology, University of California
Gary Numan – cult musician
Prof John Pickering (1939-2018) – professor of economics
Beryl Platt, Baroness Platt of Writtle (née Myatt, 1923–2015) – aviation specialist and politician
Prof Martin Schröder – Vice President and Dean of Engineering and Physical Science, Professor of Chemistry University of Manchester
Prof Ian Simmons – emeritus professor of geography, University of Durham
Prof Matthew Spriggs – professor of archaeology, Australian National University

References

External links
Old Paludians Association
Upton Court Grammar School

Educational institutions established in 1912
Grammar schools in Slough
Academies in Slough
 
1912 establishments in England